II is the second live album by Khun Narin, released on March 25, 2016 by Innovative Leisure Records.

Track listing

Personnel
Adapted from the II liner notes.

Khun Narin
 Witthawat Chimphali – bass guitar
 Phirasak Hutsi – chap cymbal
 Chanwit Khomkham – klong khaek
 Buntham Makam – klong khaek
 Wirot Manachip – chap cymbal
 Akchadawut Nangngam – klong khaek
 Wanlop Saengarun – tenor drum, splash cymbal
 Nattapol Soison – phin, chap cymbal
 Chaiyan Sonpoh – phin
 Wirot Yakham – musical direction, chap cymbal

Production and design
 Nathan Cabrera – cover art, illustrations
 Dave Cooley – mastering
 Edouard Delgay Delpeuch – photography
 Sonny Diperri – mixing
 Hanni El Khatib – art direction, design
 Josh Marcy – production, recording, photography
 Trevor Tarczynski – art direction, design

Charts

Release history

References

External links 
 
 II at Bandcamp

2016 live albums
Khun Narin albums
Innovative Leisure albums
Live instrumental albums